The Code of Marcia Gray is a 1916 silent romantic crime drama produced by Oliver Morosco, distributed through Paramount Pictures and directed by Frank Lloyd.

Cast
Constance Collier as Marcia Gray
Harry De Vere as Harry Gray
Forrest Stanley as lawyer
Frank A. Bonn as James Romaine
Howard Davies as Ed Crane
Helen Jerome Eddy as Crane's Daughter
Herbert Standing as Banker Agnew

Production background
The film is based on a true story concerning the collapse of the Knickerbocker Bank in New York. The film starred Constance Collier in her second film role. Collier made this film during her trip to the United States with Herbert Beerbohm Tree.

Preservation status
The film survives in the Library of Congress.

References

External links

 Portrait of Constance Collier and Forrest Stanley from the film

1916 films
American silent feature films
Films directed by Frank Lloyd
1916 romantic drama films
1916 crime drama films
American crime drama films
American romantic drama films
American black-and-white films
Paramount Pictures films
Surviving American silent films
Romantic crime films
1910s American films
Silent romantic drama films
Silent American drama films
1910s English-language films
Silent crime drama films